Kim Grant may refer to:

Kim Grant (footballer), Ghanaian footballer
Kim Grant (tennis), South African tennis player